Today FM is an Irish national commercial FM radio station, owned and operated by Bauer Audio Ireland Limited. Broadcasting since 17 March 1997, it broadcasts mostly music, with a daily news and current affairs programme.  Today FM holds a licence from the Broadcasting Authority of Ireland as far as the year 2027. The station recorded pretax profits of €7.4 million on a turnover of €19.4 million in early 2009, more than twice what it was two years previously.

Today FM broadcasts from studios in Marconi House, Digges Lane, Dublin 2. On 1 June 2021 Bauer Media Audio announced the completion of its acquisition of Communicorp Group in Ireland, including Today FM.

History
The first independent national radio franchise holder in the Ireland was 100-102 Century Radio, which launched in 1989 and closed down abruptly in November 1991 amid heavy financial losses. The Independent Radio and Television Commission did not re-advertise the contract until 1996.

Radio Ireland Limited, originally owned by John McColgan and Moya Doherty (and because of their involvement, dubbed "Radio Riverdance"), won the contract when it was advertised.

In 2002, Scottish Radio Holdings plc acquired Radio Ireland Limited from its shareholders. In June 2005, an agreed takeover offer for that company was made by Emap. Denis O'Brien's Communicorp was the highest bidder for Emap's Irish operations when that company decided to sell its radio stations, buying FM104, Highland Radio and Today FM on 14 July 2007. In October 2007, the Broadcasting Commission of Ireland (BCI) approved Communicorp's proposed takeover of Today FM and Highland Radio, but not FM104. The deal was completed by January 2008. Due to a Competition Authority decision, Communicorp was required to sell-on FM104, which it did (to UTV Media) immediately upon its acquisition. The takeover closed in April 2008.

In 2008, Today FM moved their studios from their original base at 112 Upper Abbey Street, Dublin, across the Liffey to Marconi House in Digges Lane, Dublin 2, where it shares the building with its Communicorp sister station, Newstalk. The building also housed another Communicorp station, Phantom (later TXFM), until it ceased broadcasting in October 2016. In June 2017 it was announced that the group's other Dublin-based stations, 98FM and Spin 1038, would also be moving into the same premises.

The experienced broadcaster and radio programmer Tom Hardy served as the station's Director of Programming from 1998 until January 2013, when he was replaced by Martin McGuire. The position was later taken up by the station's former evening presenter Colm O'Sullivan, now of Cork's Red FM. Adelle Nolan took over the role in 2016 and it is now held by Phil Manzor, formally of Spin 1038 and Spin South West.

On Tuesday 1 June 2021 Bauer Media Audio announced the completion of its acquisition of Communicorp Group in Ireland, including Today FM.

Broadcast history
The station went on air, originally known as Radio Ireland, on St. Patrick's Day, 17 March 1997. At first, the station was a mixed network, airing much talk programming and various types of music. However, following six months of disastrous ratings, and with a listenership of just 1%, the station was revamped, and on 1 January 1998 became 100-102 Today FM. The station axed almost all of its programming and changed its music policy entirely. Eamon Dunphy's co-host (Anne-Marie Hourihan) was axed, with him being heavily promoted as a solo act and Ian Dempsey and Ray D'Arcy were poached from arch-rivals RTÉ. The IRTC went along with the schedule changes, though in a statement soon after the relaunch said it was not entirely satisfied with the new schedule. However, within three months, the station's listenership had almost doubled.

Today FM reshuffled its daytime schedule in 2004, reducing The Ian Dempsey Breakfast Show to add an extra hour to The Ray D'Arcy Show so that it could compete directly with rival, The Gerry Ryan Show. Philip Cawley's afternoon show was reduced and Tony Fenton was given a lunchtime show.

In April 2006, Ray D'Arcy conducted an interview with comedian Des Bishop. Bishop joked about being gay. D'Arcy asked Bishop to provide an "exclusive". Bishop said, "I'm gay... I'm not, but hey!" D'Arcy said, "You're very comfortable with your sexuality?" Bishop said, "Me and Derek Mooney are doing a show". The audience laughed. D'Arcy moved to a commercial break before, he said, Bishop "outs anyone else". The incident provoked much commentary in the media, with the Sunday Independent observing "Instantly, the Irish-American comedian was the villain of the piece and Derek was all over the front page", while Ray D'Arcy was also criticised for his choice of words.

On 29 February 2008, Matt Cooper's The Last Word was the final show to be presented from the old studios. The first show to be presented from the new Digges Lane studio was Friday Night 80s with Phil Cawley from 19:00. The first song played was "Welcome to the Pleasuredome" by Frankie Goes to Hollywood.

Today FM had a crucial role in the Brian Cowen nude portraits controversy of March 2009, specifically Will Hanafin and The Ray D'Arcy Show.

On 15 October 2011, Today FM confirmed Sam Smyth's Sunday radio show was being dropped. He had been presenting it for 14 years. Smyth had previously offended his bosses by commenting in a newspaper and on television about the Moriarty Tribunal which criticised Today FM owner Denis O'Brien. Smyth said on air the next morning that he had been told not to talk about the end of his show and stopped one of his guests from talking about it too "before someone comes downstairs and pulls a wire we better move onto something else." The National Union of Journalists (NUJ) said it was concerned at the development. The Irish Independent, of which Denis O'Brien is a leading shareholder, reported that Anton Savage was being lined up to replace Sam Smyth. Eamon Dunphy subsequently resigned from Today FM's sister station Newstalk, in solidarity with Smyth and because, he said, the radio station's management wanted "dissenting voices" such as Constantin Gurdgiev off the airwaves.

Current presenters and shows

2014–present changes 
Ray D'Arcy hosted the weekday mid-morning slot for 15 years but abruptly left Today FM to rejoin RTÉ with immediate effect in December 2014. Alison Curtis served as an interim host until the appointment of Anton Savage who began his show, The Anton Savage Show on 26 January 2015, which now airs every Monday to Friday from 9 am to midday. Savage's previous Sunday morning show, "Savage Show" which aired every Sunday from 11 am to 1 pm ended and the slot was taken over by comedian Neil Delamere who now presents his own show titled "Neil Delamere's Sunday Best" which airs every Sunday from 11 am to 1 pm.

On 17 August 2015, Colm O'Sullivan announced that his show The Mix-Up which had aired every Monday-Thursday 7-9 pm was ending after three years of being on-air and that O'Sullivan himself was retiring from the DJ business after nearly twenty years to take up a position as the new Programme Director of Today FM, O'Sullivan having joined Today FM in February 2013 with his show, "The Mix-Up" airing for the first time on Monday 4 February 2013.

Anton Savage left the radio station on 2 December 2016 due to a disagreement with the radio station, and was replaced by Dermot Whelan and Dave Moore. On 25 January 2017, comedian Al Porter was announced, live on air, as the new host of the midday show, moving into Whelan and Moore's old slot.  On 13 February 2017, Porter's show aired for the first time. However, in November 2017, after allegations of sexual misconduct made against Porter, he decided to resign from Today FM with immediate effect.

Current schedule
Today FM airs a mixture of popular music and news and current affairs programming. Its current schedule begins on weekdays with The Ian Dempsey Breakfast Show, followed by Dermot & Dave. Pamela Joyce presents the lunchtime show.  Its afternoon co-hosts are Ray Foley and JP Gilbourne. The early evening current affairs programme is The Last Word, presented by Matt Cooper. Paula McSweeney then presents the early evening slot from 7pm to 10pm.  This is followed by Ed Smith's show, which broadcasts until midnight. 

Weekend shows include Block Rockin' Beats on Friday evenings, a 90s dance music show hosted by Dec Pierce, followed by Friday Night Anthems presented by Jessica Maciel; Saturday and Sunday Breakfast with Alison Curtis; Pumped Up Kicks, a Saturday afternoon music, sports and magazine programme with Dec Pierce; Saturday Hits with Shauna O'Reilly; and Claire Beck's Saturday Sound System. Further Sunday shows are presented again by Jessica Maciel, Paula McSweeney and Claire Beck, with Ed Smith finishing the weekend with an extended show until 1am on Sunday evenings.

Former presenters of Radio Ireland/Today FM include Louise Duffy, Keith "KC" Cunningham, Philip Boucher-Hayes, Mark Byrne, Mark Cagney, Enda Caldwell (Planet Hits and later, Nothin'But 90's)  Breffni Clack (Late Nite Love), Bob Conway, Tom Dunne (Pet Sounds), Eamon Dunphy (original presenter of The Last Word), Tony Fenton, Derek Flood, Declan Meehan, Bob Gallico, Nadine O'Regan, Tommy Greene, Anne-Marie Hourihan (originally Eamon Dunphy's co-host), Bill Hughes, Robbie Irwin (weekend sports programs presenter), Mark Kavanagh (dance show), Ann Marie Kelly, John Kelly, Tim Kelly, Cliff Walker, Stephen Keogh, Gerard Gogan, Dave Redmond, Tracey Lee, Nails Mahoney, Marty Miller, the late Dermot Morgan, Paddy Murray and Liam Mackey (Murray and Mackey), Ian Noctor (newsreader who also for a period presented Dad Rock), Ed Myers, Jim O'Neill, Paul Power, Ita Ryan (The Celtic Reel), John Ryan (original presenter of The Sunday Supplement), Donal Scannell, Jon Troy (Between The Sheets - love songs), Karl Tsigdinos (The River of Soul), Neil Delamere, Dave Couse, Anton Savage, Ray D'Arcy, Al Porter, Kelly-Anne Byrne, Paul McLoone, Phil Cawley, Mairead Ronan and Fergal D'arcy.

The current Today FM schedule and list of shows can be found here.

Additional Stations
On 26 March 2018, Today FM launched sister streaming-only stations that focus on music from the 1980s, 1990s, and alternative indie music: Today FM 80s, Today FM 90s and Today XM. In 2019, four more streaming stations launched - Today FM 00s, Today FM Rock Anthems, Today FM All Irish and Today FM Block Rockin' Beats. The streaming-only stations are available through the TodayFM.com website and associated app.

See also
 Radio in the Republic of Ireland

References

External links
 Official website

 
Communicorp
Mass media companies of Ireland
Radio stations established in 1997
Radio stations in Northern Ireland
Radio stations in the Republic of Ireland